Tellimagrandin I is an ellagitannin found in plants, such as Cornus canadensis, Eucalyptus globulus, Melaleuca styphelioides, Rosa rugosa, and walnut. It is composed of two galloyl and one hexahydroxydiphenyl groups bound to a glucose residue. It differs from Tellimagrandin II only by a hydroxyl group instead of a third galloyl group. It is also structurally similar to punigluconin and pedunculagin, two more ellagitannin monomers.

Tellimagrandin I has been shown to restore antioxidant enzyme activity in glucose- and oxalate-challenged rat cells and affects Cu(II)- and Fe(II)-dependent DNA strand breaks. It has hepatoprotective effects on carbon tetrachloride- and d-galactosamine-stressed HepG2 cells and enhances peroxisomal fatty acid beta-oxidation in liver, increasing mRNA expression of PPAR alpha, ACOX1, and CPT1A. It enhances gap junction communication and reduces tumor phenotype in HeLa cells and inhibits invasion of HSV-1 and HCV similar to eugeniin and casuarictin.

See also
 Ellagitannin
 Pedunculagin
 Punigluconin
 Tellimagrandin II

References

Ellagitannins
Astringent flavors